Robert Dale Richardson III (June 14, 1934 – June 16, 2020) was an American historian and biographer.

Early life
Richardson was born in Milwaukee, and brought up in Medford, Massachusetts, and Concord, Massachusetts. He graduated from Exeter, in 1952, and from Harvard University, with a PhD.

Career
He taught at the University of Denver, Harvard University, Yale University, The University of Colorado, Queens College, City University of New York, Sichuan University, Wesleyan University, and the University of North Carolina at Chapel Hill.

Richardson was known for his biographies of Henry Thoreau, Ralph Waldo Emerson, and William James. Emerson: The Mind on Fire won the Francis Parkman Prize in 1996, and William James: In the Maelstrom of American Modernism won the Bancroft Prize in 2007.

In the first half of his career, he published as Robert D. Richardson, Jr.  Later, he dropped the "Jr."

Personal life and death
Richardson was first married to Elizabeth Hall; they had two daughters.

He married Annie Dillard in 1988, after she wrote him a fan letter about Henry Thoreau: A Life of the Mind.

He was program chair for New Voices at the Key West Literary Seminar.

Richardson died in Hyannis, Massachusetts on June 16, 2020, two days after his 86th birthday, from a subdural hematoma suffered in a fall.

Awards
 2007 Bancroft Prize
 1990 Guggenheim Fellowship
 1996 Francis Parkman Prize
 Melcher Book Award

Works
This section lists only Richardson's book-length publications. For his dozens of essays, forwards, and reviews, see the author's official website.

Biographical books
 Henry Thoreau: A Life of the Mind. University of California Press. 1986.
 Emerson: The Mind on Fire. University of California Press. 1996.
 William James: In the Maelstrom of American Modernism. Houghton Mifflin Harcourt. 2007
First We Read, Then We Write: Emerson on the Creative Process. University of Iowa Press. 2009.
Splendor of Heart: Walter Jackson Bate and the Teaching of Literature. David R. Godine, Publisher. 2013.
Nearer the Heart's Desire: Poets of the Rubaiyat: A Dual Biography of Omar Khayyam and Edward FitzGerald. Bloomsbury. 2016.
 Three Roads Back: How Emerson, Thoreau, and William James Responded to the Greatest Losses of Their Lives. Princeton University Press. 2023.
Scholarly monographs

 Literature and Film. Indiana University Press. 1969.
 Myth and Literature in the American Renaissance. Indiana University Press. 1978.

Edited and introduced collections

 With Burton Feldman. The rise of modern mythology, 1680-1860. Indiana University Press. 2000.
 Emerson, Ralph Waldo. Selected Essays, Lectures, and Poems. Bantam. 1990.
 With Allen Mandelbaum. Three Centuries of American Poetry. Bantam. 1999. (Also published as A Treasury of American Poetry.)
 James, William. The Heart of William James. Harvard University Press. 2010.
 Thoreau, Henry David. October, or Autumnal Tints. Norton. 2012.
 Khayyam, Omar. The Rubaiyat of Omar Khayyam. Bloomsbury. 2016.

References

External links

"Author's website"
"An Interview with Robert D. Richardson", Bookslut, December 2006
"An Interview with Robert D. Richardson", College Hill Review, James Barszcz, No. 4, Fall 2009

"A Talk by Robert D. Richardson", Blackbird, Spring 2007
"Review - The pragmatic American: William James and our homegrown way of thought", Harper's, January 2007

1934 births
2020 deaths
20th-century American historians
20th-century American male writers
21st-century American historians
21st-century American male writers
Accidental deaths from falls
Accidental deaths in Massachusetts
American biographers
Harvard University alumni
People from Concord, Massachusetts
People from Medford, Massachusetts
Phillips Exeter Academy alumni
Wesleyan University faculty
Writers from Massachusetts
Writers from Milwaukee
Bancroft Prize winners